Crotaphytus insularis, the eastern collared lizard, is a species of lizard found in Mexico.

References

Crotaphytus
Reptiles described in 1921
Taxa named by John Van Denburgh
Taxa named by Joseph Richard Slevin
Reptiles of Mexico